FK Vučijak (Serbian Cyrillic: ФК Bучиjaк Majeвaц) is a football club based in Majevac, Republika Srpska, Bosnia and Herzegovina.

History

Current team

Notable coaches
 Branislav Petričević
 Slavko Milanović
 Sakib Hadžić
 Vedran Sofić

External links
 Results at BiHsoccer.

Football clubs in Bosnia and Herzegovina
Football clubs in Republika Srpska